is a neighbourhood in Shōwa-ku, Nagoya, central Japan.

Kawana used to be a village and was later incorporated in the 1930s.

The Buddhist temple of Kōjaku-in is located there. Kawana ware used to be produced there during the late Edo period.

It is served by Kawana Station and Irinaka Station on the Nagoya Subway Tsurumai Line.

The area of Yagoto is next to it.

References 

Neighbourhoods of Nagoya